Claudio de la Torre (October 30, 1895 - January 10, 1973) was a Spanish novelist, poet, dramatist and film director. He was the brother of acclaimed poet and actress Josefina de la Torre.

Selected filmography
 When Do You Commit Suicide? (1932)
 The White Dove (1942)

1895 births
1973 deaths
Spanish male writers
Spanish male actors